Trevor Horne may refer to:

 Trevor Horne (New Zealand politician), mayor of Nelson, New Zealand from 1968 to 1971
 Trevor Horne (Canadian politician), Member of the Legislative Assembly of Alberta from 2015

See also 
 Trevor Horn, English record producer